Frank Porter Stansberry is an American financial publisher and author. Stansberry founded Stansberry Research (previously Stansberry & Associates Investment Research), a private publishing company based in Baltimore, Maryland, in 1999. He is the author of the monthly newsletter, Stansberry's Investment Advisory, which covers investments and investment theory in commodities, real estate, and the stock market. Stansberry is also the creator of the 2011 online video The End of America, in which he predicts the imminent collapse of the United States. In 2002, the SEC brought a case for securities fraud, and a federal judge fined him $1.5 million in 2007.

Career

In 1999, Stansberry founded Stansberry Research, a private publishing company based in Baltimore, Maryland.

SEC case
In 2002, Stansberry sent out an email offering to sell for $1,000 the name of a company purportedly about to obtain a contract to dismantle nuclear weapons for Russia. The Securities and Exchange Commission sued him in 2003 on this basis and for his newsletters containing "nothing more than baseless speculation and outright lies", accusing him of a "scheme to defraud public investors by disseminating false information in several Internet newsletters." The case went to trial in 2005, and a federal court found that Stansberry had sent out a newsletter to subscribers predicting one company's stock, USEC Inc., would increase by over 100%. Stansberry maintains his information came from a company executive; the court ruled he fabricated the source. The verdict was upheld on appeal.  The court rejected Stansberry's First Amendment defense, saying "Stansberry's conduct undoubtedly involved deliberate fraud, making statements that he knew to be false." In 2007, U.S. District Court Judge Marvin J. Garbis ordered Stansberry and his investment firm, then called "Pirate Investor", to pay $1.5 million in restitution and civil penalties for defrauding "public investors by disseminating false information in several Internet newsletters." 

At the time of the trial, many media outlets spoke out due to their views that the case was relevant to First Amendment rights. A group of newspaper publishers urged the Supreme Court to reverse the decision by the United States Court of Appeals for the Fourth Circuit that Stansberry was liable, and signed an Amici Curiae in defense of Stansberry. They claimed that a guilty verdict was "a significant threat to the free dissemination of news about the financial markets and specific investment opportunities" and could lead to a situation that "would be contrary to the spirit of our system of a free and independent press." When the Supreme Court refused to hear the case, a New York Times editorial column noted that "the implications of the S.E.C.'s action are potentially profound: newspapers or Web sites promising their paying readers stock information that later turns out to be untrue suddenly leave themselves open to fraud charges. Any financial commentator who passes on bad information in good faith could be sued."

Continued career 
Stansberry was also previously the editor of the internet financial newsletters Porter Stansberry's Investment Advisory and Porter Stansberry's Put Strategy Report. He also contributes regularly to Daily Wealth and The Growth Stock Wire, other Stansberry Research publications.

He became the first American editor of the Fleet Street Letter, Britain's longest-running financial newsletter. Stansberry is a frequent contributor to WorldNet Daily, an American web site that publishes news and associated content from the perspective of U.S. conservatives and the political right.

In June 2017, Stansberry Research Publications began publishing a financial/political online opinion magazine, American Consequences, which ostensibly is intended to be, "a new, online magazine about what's really happening in American finance… and what's about to happen next." The Editor in Chief was libertarian journalist, humorist and commentator, P. J. O'Rourke. Stansberry is listed as a contributing editor. The free publication includes many ads for Stansberry publications and seminars.

Rivera case

On May 16, 2006, Stansberry's childhood friend and coworker Rey Rivera went missing and was later found dead inside the Belvedere Hotel. The case was portrayed in the Netflix reboot of Unsolved Mysteries.

Claims and predictions
Porter Stansberry claims to have made a number of successful financial market predictions. In June 2008, Porter claims that he predicted that Fannie Mae and Freddie Mac would go bankrupt in the next 12 months, as well as going on to say that he positioned his clients to profit by shorting stocks, and that he does not know of any other firm that "more accurately forecasted" or warned that the financial crisis was coming.  By September 2008, both mortgage companies were placed into government conservatorship. 

In 2008, Stansberry released a "tip" to his subscribers to invest heavily in gold. The full heading was "Why You Must Buy Gold, or Even Better, Silver, Now".

The End of America 

In 2011, Stansberry produced a 77-minute promotional video titled The End of America. Adam Wiederman of The Motley Fool referred to The End of America as a mixture of valid points and hyperbole.

References

External links

Living people
American political writers
American male non-fiction writers
21st-century American non-fiction writers
21st-century American male writers
1972 births